Napoleon Leading the Army over the Alps is an equestrian portrait of a youthful black male painted by the contemporary artist Kehinde Wiley in 2005. It is based on Jacques-Louis David’s 1801 equestrian portrait, Napoleon Crossing the Alps.  This painting was chosen by a man who Wiley had approached in the streets.  The basic composition of Wiley's painting is the same as the 200-year-old painting it was based on, and has many of the same elements.  The modern painting has a decorative background rather than the battlefield background. It is in the Brooklyn Museum.

Background
The painting is very typical of the style of Kehinde Wiley in that it is a monumental painting that incorporates brocade/decorative motif as an element of the background. It is seen against a rich red background embellished with gold floral motifs.

Similarities between the two paintings

The basic composition of Wiley's painting is similar to the well-known portrait of Napoleon Bonaparte by Jacques-Louis David, and the two paintings share many elements.

Notes

References
 Banks, Andre. "NO POSER HERE; Acclaimed Artist Kehinde Wiley Paints Black Masculinity Anew." ColorLines 8, no. 4 (Winter 2006): 57.
 Lenzi, Carlotta. "Jacques-Louis David: Artistic Interpretation in Tumultuous Times." (2008).
 Munhall, Edgar. "Portraits of Napoleon." Yale French Studies no. 26, The Myth of Napoleon (1960): 3-20.
 Shareef, Shahrazad A. "The Power of Decor: Kehinde Wiley's Interventions into the Construction of Black Masculine Identity." UMI Dissertations Publishing (2010).

External links
“Napoleon Leading the Army over the Alps.” Brooklyn Museum. 
Kehinde Wiley FAQ. Kehinde Wiley Studio.
smarthistory.org

2005 paintings
Black people in art
Equestrian portraits
Paintings of Napoleon
Works by Kehinde Wiley